Ningbo (Ningbo dialect: gnin² poq⁷ ,), formerly romanized as Ningpo, is a major sub-provincial city in northeast Zhejiang province, People's Republic of China. It comprises six urban districts, two satellite county-level cities, and two rural counties, including several islands in Hangzhou Bay and the East China Sea. Ningbo is the southern economic center of the Yangtze Delta megalopolis, and is also the core city and center of the Ningbo Metropolitan Area. To the north, Hangzhou Bay separates Ningbo from Shanghai; to the east lies Zhoushan in the East China Sea; on the west and south, Ningbo borders Shaoxing and Taizhou respectively. As of the 2020 Chinese national census, the entire administrated area of Ningbo City had a population of 9.4 million (9,404,283), of which 4,479,635 lived in the built-up (or metro) area of its five urban districts. Within the next decade, the cities of Cixi, Yunhao and Fenghua will likely also be conurbated, expanding the Ningbo metro area to 8,140,660 inhabitants.

Ningbo is one of the 15 sub-provincial cities in China, and is one of the five separate state-planning cities in China (the other four being Dalian, Qingdao, Xiamen, and Shenzhen), with the municipality possessing a separate state-planning status in many economic departments, rather than being governed by Zhejiang Province. Therefore, Ningbo has provincial-level autonomy in making economic and financial policies.

In 2022, the GDP of Ningbo was CNY 1570,43 billion (US$233.479 billion), and it was ranked 12th among 293 cities in China. Moreover, Ningbo is among the wealthiest cities in China; it ranked 8th in terms of average yearly disposable income in the year of 2020. As of 2020, Ningbo has global headquarters and registered offices of over 100 listed companies, and many regional business headquarters. In 2021, Ningbo featured the seventh most listed companies of all cities in China. Furthermore, Ningbo was among the top 10 Chinese cities in the Urban Business Environment Report released by the Chinese state media China Central Television (CCTV) in 2019.

As a city with rich culture and a long history dating back to the Jingtou Mountain Culture in 6300 BC and the Hemudu culture in 4800 BC, Ningbo was awarded "City of Culture in East Asia" by the governments of China, Japan, and Korea in 2016. Ningbo is one of the top 200 cities in the world by scientific research as tracked by the Nature Index. 

The port of Ningbo–Zhoushan, spread across several locations, is the world's busiest port by cargo tonnage and world's third-busiest container port since 2010.

Etymology
The first character in the city's name ning ( or ) means "serene", while its second character bo translates to "wave". The city is abbreviated "" for the eponymous "Yong Hill", a prominent coastal hill near the city, and the Yong River that flows through Ningbo city.

Ningbo was once named Mingzhou. The first character is composed of two parts, representing two lakes inside the city wall: the Sun Lake and the Moon Lake, dating back to the Tang dynasty in 636 AD. The old Sun Lake dried up in the 19th century, but was re-built in 2002 by the Ningbo government as one of the city parks.

History

Ningbo is one of China's oldest cities, with a history dating to the Jingtou Mountain Culture in 6300 BC and Hemudu culture in 4800 BC. Ningbo was known as a trade city on the silk road at least two thousand years ago, and later as a major port for foreign trade.

Ancient to Sui dynasty

As of 2020, the earliest relics of human activity discovered in Ningbo City are from the Jingtou Mountain site in Yuyao. These relics date back to 6300 BC, evidencing early human consumption of seafood and rice. A large number of cultivated rice, farming tools, remains of dry fence buildings, remains of domestic livestock, and primitive religious items have been unearthed from related sites of the Hemudu culture (5000–4500 BC), evidencing human settlement and culture in the eastern part of the Ningshao Plain, where modern-day Ningbo city is located.

Before the Han dynasty, the area where Ningbo City is located today was sparsely populated. In the Xia dynasty, the location of Ningbo was called "Yin". In the Spring and Autumn Period, the area where Ningbo belonged was the Yue State. At that time, the Yue King Goujian built Juzhang City in the present-day Cicheng Town, which became the earliest city in Ningbo. In the latter half of the Warring States period, the area of Ningbo became the jurisdiction of Chu State. In 221 BC, Qin unified the six states and the Ningbo area was delegated to Kuaiji Commandery, with three counties of Yin, Yin, and Juzhang (some studies assert there were four counties of Yin, Yin, Juzhang, and Yuyao). In the early years of the Western Han dynasty, Kuaiji Commandery belonged to the Kingdom of Jing and Wu. After the Seven Kingdoms was settled, Kuaiji Commandery was restored. In 589 AD (Sui Kai Huang nine years), the counties were merged under the Wu kingdom.

Tang and Song dynasty

Since the Tang dynasty, Ningbo has been an important commercial port. Arab traders lived in Ningbo during the Song dynasty when it was known as Mingzhou or Siming, since the ocean-going trade passages took precedence over land trade during this time. It was a well known center of ocean-going commerce with the foreign world. These merchants did not intermingle with native Chinese, instead practicing their own customs and religion and inhabiting ghettos. They did not try to proselytize Islam to the Chinese. There was also a large Jewish community in Ningbo, as evidenced by the fact that, after a major flood destroyed Torah scrolls in Kaifeng in 1642, a replacement was sent to the Kaifeng Jews by the Jews at Ningbo.

Ming dynasty

The city of Ningbo was known in Europe for a long time under the name of Liampó. This was the usual spelling used, e.g. in the standard Portuguese history, João de Barros's Décadas da Ásia, although Barros explained that Liampó was a Portuguese "corruption" of the more correct Nimpó. The spelling Liampó is also attested to in the Peregrination (Peregrinação) by Fernão Mendes Pinto, a (so-called) autobiography written in Portuguese during the 16th century. For the mid-16th-century Portuguese, the nearby promontory, which they called the cape of Liampó after the nearby "illustrious city", was the easternmost known point of the mainland Asia. The Portuguese began trading in Ningbo around 1522. By 1542, the Portuguese had a sizable community in Ningbo (or, more likely, on nearby small islands such as Shuangyu). Portuguese activities from their Ningbo base included pillaging and attacking multiple Chinese port cities around Ningbo for plunder and spoil. They also enslaved people during their raids. The Portuguese were ousted from the Ningbo area in 1548.

Qing dynasty
Ningbo was one of the five Chinese treaty ports opened by the Treaty of Nanjing (signed in 1842) at the end of the First Opium War between Britain and China. During the war, British forces briefly took possession of the walled city of Ningbo after storming the fortified town of Zhenhai at the mouth of the Yong River on October 10, 1841. The British subsequently repulsed a Chinese attempt to retake the city in the Battle of Ningpo on March 10, 1842. In 1861, the forces of the Taiping Kingdom took the city relatively unopposed as the defending garrison and all Ningbo residents fled except for the Jews and Persians; they held the town for six months. In March 1885, during the Sino-French War, Admiral Courbet's naval squadron blockaded several Chinese warships in Zhenhai Bay and exchanged fire with the shore defenses.

Ningbo was also once famed for traditional Chinese furniture production, and western encyclopedias described Ningbo as a center of craftsmanship and industry.

During the 1800s, Ningbo authorities contracted Cantonese pirates to exterminate Portuguese pirates who had raided Canton shipping around Ningbo. The massacre was "successful", with 40 Portuguese dead and only 2 Cantonese dead. It was dubbed "The Ningpo Massacre" by an English correspondent, who noted that the Portuguese pirates had behaved savagely towards the Cantonese Chinese, and that the Portuguese authorities at Macau should have reined in the pirates.

During the late Qing era, Western missionaries set up a Presbyterian Church in Ningbo. Li Veng-eing was a Reverend of the Ningpo Church. The Ningpo College was managed by Rev. Robert F. Fitch. The four trustees were natives of Ningbo, and three of them had Taotai rank. Rev. George Evans Moule, B.A., was appointed as a missionary to China by the Church of England Missionary Society, and arrived at Ningpo with Mrs. Moule in February 1858. His time was chiefly divided between Ningpo and another mission station he began at Hang-chow. He wrote Christian publications in the Ningbo dialect.

Republican era
During WWII in 1940, between 80% to 90% of Ningbo's population fled Ningbo, leaving only the elderly behind before the Japanese bombed Ningbo with ceramic bombs full of fleas carrying the bubonic plague. According to Daniel Barenblatt, imperial planes loading germ bombs for bubonic dissemination over Ningbo was recorded on film in 1940.

“It has been said of the Ningbo fishermen that, 'no people in the world apparently made so great an advance in the art of fishing; and for centuries past no people have made so little further progress.'”

Geography

Ningbo ranges in latitude from 28° 51' to 30° 33' N and in longitude from 120° 55' to 122° 16' E, bounded on the east by the East China Sea and Zhoushan Archipelago; on the north by Hangzhou Bay, across which it faces Jiaxing and Shanghai; on the west by Shaoxing; and on the south by Taizhou. There are 531 islands accounting for  under the city's administration.

Ningbo's city proper is sandwiched between the ocean and low-lying mountains to the southwest, with coastal plain and valleys in between. Important peninsulas include the Chuanshan Peninsula, located in Beilun District and containing mainland Zhejiang's easternmost point, and the Xiangshan Peninsula in Xiangshan County.

Tidal flat ecosystems occur adjacent to the city, however, a large areas have been reclaimed for agricultural purposes.

Climate
Ningbo has a humid subtropical climate (Köppen Cfa) with four distinctive seasons, characterized by hot, humid summers and chilly, cloudy and dry winters (with occasional snow). From August to October, Ningbo experiences the effects of typhoons, and is affected by an average 1.8 storms annually, though the city is not often struck directly by these systems. A 2012 OECD study lists Ningbo among the top 20 cities worldwide most at risk of flooding due to anthropogenic climate change.

Administrative structure and divisions
Local officers of Ningbo

 The Secretary of Party in Ningbo is Peng Jiaxue, who is first-in-charge of the city.
 The Mayor of Ningbo is Qiu Dongyao, who is second-in command of the city, and the Vice Secretary of Party in Ningbo.

Administrative divisions of Ningbo

The sub-provincial city of Ningbo is as whole an urban group with one central group, one northern group, and one southern group.

It has direct jurisdiction over the following:

 Six districts (central group): Haishu District, Yinzhou District, Jiangbei District, Beilun District, Zhenhai District, Fenghua District
 Two county-level cities (northern group): Yuyao, Cixi
 Two counties (southern group): Xiangshan, Ninghai

 Defunct: Jiangdong District

Economy
The city's export industry dates back to the 7th century. Today, Ningbo is a major exporter of electrical products, textiles, food, and industrial tools. The city's private sector is especially well-developed, contributing 80 percent of total GDP in 2013.

Historically, Ningbo was somewhat geographically isolated from other major cities. In 2007 the Hangzhou Bay Bridge was built, cutting highway transit time between Ningbo and Shanghai from four hours to two and a half. The city now serves as the economic center for the southern Yangtze River Delta and has been ranked among the most competitive cities in China.

In 2009, Ningbo's economic activity reached US$60.8 billion, down 10.4% from 2008. The exports totaled US$38.65 billion, down 16.6% from the previous year. In addition, Ningbo imported US$22.16 billion of goods, up 3.1% from the previous year.

Ningbo's economy grew 9.26% in 2013 to 712.89 billion yuan (US$115.12 billion). In 2009, the city's per capita output was US$10,833, about three times the national average.

Ningbo is famous for the Si Lan Nong Xiang flower, which is used for dying cloth. In 2008, Ningbo's cloth exports were responsible for 3% of its economic growth.

Foreign investment
With several important development zones established in or around Ningbo, the city has received considerable foreign investment. Over 60 domestic and foreign-invested financial institutions have established operations in the city, which has also attracted more than 10,000 foreigners. The municipal government offers preferential policies designed to encourage investment in international trade, new strategic industries, manufacturing, information services, and creative industries.

Economic and technological development zones

Ningbo Economic & Technological Development Zone
With more than 20 years of great effort, NETD has already formed the general framework for large scale construction and development, and established the perfect investment environment. It is situated close to the Ningbo Port and Ningbo Lishe International Airport. Major Investors include ExxonMobil, Dupont and Dow Chemical.

Ningbo Daxie Development Zone
Over more than ten years of development and construction, industrial and logistical foundations have been established in the zone for the transshipment of energy, liquid chemicals and containers.

Ningbo National Hi-Tech Industrial Development Zone
Ningbo National Hi-Tech Industrial Development Zone was founded in 1999 and was upgraded to a national level zone in January 2007. The zone serves as the important technical innovation base of Yangtze River Delta. Industries encouraged include chemicals production and processing, biotechnology and pharmaceuticals, raw material processing, Research and Development.

Ningbo Free Trade Zone
Ningbo Free Trade Zone is one of the 15 free trade zones authorized by the State Council of China, and is the only free trade zone in Zhejiang Province. It lies in the middle of the coastline of Mainland China, at the south of Yangtze River Delta. In 2008, its industrial output value was RMB 53.33 billion and grew at 19.8% as compared to 2007.

Nordic Industrial Park
The Nordic Industrial Park Co. Ltd. (NIP) is one of the first wholly foreign-owned industrial parks in China located in Ningbo, Zhejiang Province. NIP is managed and operated by a Scandinavian management team.

Ningbo Advertising Park
The Ningbo Advertising Park is a national level pilot park located in the Ningbo Southern Business District. The financial incentives have attracted over 300 relevant firms to establish operations.

Ningbo Port

Unlike other cities, Ningbo has the same authority as provincial governments for economic administration and is the largest port in the world in terms of annual cargo throughput. In contrast to Shanghai, the port is deep-water and capable of handling 300,000 ton vessels. The port is located mainly in Beilun district and Zhenhai district. In 2006, Ningbo Port started its expansion towards the neighboring island city of Zhoushan to build an even larger port with higher capacity to compete with neighboring ports in the region, such as Shanghai's Yangshan Deep-Water Port. Statistics in 2010 showed that total cargo throughput was 627,000,000 tonnes and container throughput 13,144,000 TEUs. In 2021, total cargo throughput was 1,224,050,000 tonnes, including 31,080,000 TEUs. Ningbo proper saw 623,400,000 tonnes and 29,370,000 TEUs, while Zhoushan saw 600,650,000 tonnes and 1,710 000,TEUs.
Thus, with bulk container breakdowns, hugely improved logistics, and massive chemical and foodstuff, processing developments, Ningbo is outcompeting Shanghai for the preeminent Chinese east coast port.
 Ningbo is part of the 21st Century Maritime Silk Road that runs from the Chinese coast to the south, via Singapore towards the southern tip of India, via Mombasa to the Mediterranean, and from there via Athens to the Upper Adriatic region to the northern Italian hub of Trieste with its rail connections to Central and the Eastern Europe.

Tourism
Due to its long history and economic prosperity, Ningbo is a city with very rich tourist resources. The following is a list of the main tourist attractions authorized by the Ningbo Municipal Bureau of Culture, Radio, Television and Tourism in each subdivision of Ningbo city.

Main tourist attractions in 6 urban districts 

Haishu District
 Moon Lake Park (Yuehu Park): A reservoir excavated in the Tang dynasty (636 AD) at the center of Haishu District. The park includes the lake itself, some small islands on the lake, and many ancient Chinese architectures and historical sites, such as:
 Tianyi Pavilion (Tianyi Ge or Tianyi Chamber): One of Ningbo's most popular and famous tourist attractions. Built in 1516 AD, it is the oldest library existent in Asia and is one of the 3 oldest private libraries in the world. The collection dates back to the 11th century and includes woodblock and handwritten copies of the Confucian classics, rare local histories, and lists of the candidates successful in imperial examinations. The currently Tianyi Pavilion refers to the whole museum complex that includes:
The historical library-related buildings
The ancient Chinese mansion of the library's first owner, Fan Qing, built during the Ming dynasty (1516 AD)
A traditional Chinese Garden as part of Fan's mansion
An ancient private theater of Chinese plays as part of Fan's mansion
A small Mahjong (麻将) museum, since Ningbo is regarded one of the birthplace of Mahjong
The Yuehu Mosque (Moon Lake Mosque): A historical monument built in 1003 AD in the Song dynasty.
 Buddhist Jushi Lin: A 700-year-old Buddhist lodge located on the beautiful Liutingzhou (an island of the Moon Lake), the lake scenery, and cultural landscape of the area.
 Shuize Stele: A stone stele used to measure water level in Pingqiao River near the Moon Lake, built in 1242 AD during the South Song dynasty. A protective pavilion for the stele was built during the Qing dynasty.
 He Mijian Ci (贺秘监祠): A cultural relic protection built in honor of the Chinese poet He Zhizhang (賀知章, 659 AD – 744 AD) during the Tang dynasty. He called himself the "Siming Crazy Guest", where "Siming" is the name of a mountain in Ningbo. The building was completed during the Song dynasty (1144 AD) and repaired during the Qing dynasty (1865 AD).
 Ancient Korean Embassy: Built during the Northern Song dynasty to welcome the Korean envoys and business groups. Destroyed by war in 1130 AD, the site was announced as a cultural relics protection unit in 1984. It is now a showroom for the history of relations between Ningbo and Korea.
 Central Lake Temple, Central Lake East Bridge, Zhenming Ridge, and Xuanmiao Temple: A Ningbo-born novelist Qu You wrote a fiction called Peony Dengji (牡丹灯记, Janpanese: Botan Dōrō also known as 怪談牡丹灯籠 Tales of the Peony Lantern ) (in the collection of Jiandeng Xinhua). It describes a love story between ghost and a man during Fang Guozhen period. The story took place at the Moon Lake. Japanese scholar Koyama Issei identified many of the locations, including Central Lake Temple, Central Lake East Bridge, Zhenming Ridge, and Xuanmiao temple, that would fit geographically and architecturally of the places mentioned in the story. The story was adapted as one of one of three Kaidan tales in Japan.
 Drum Tower Complex (Haishu Tower): The only remaining ruin of an old city gate tower constructed during the Tang dynasty. At the top, there is a six-meter high Romanesque bell tower added in the Republic period. Around the base of the tower is a commercial area where all the buildings are reconstructed in the traditional style.
 Chenghuang Temple (Ningbo County Temple): An ancient temple of the City God at commercial center in downtown Ningbo.
 Tianfeng Pagoda: This national cultural relics protection site is a typical Song-style loft-style brick-wood structure tower unique to Jiangnan. This hexagonal building is a landmark and the tallest ancient structure in the city. It appears as a seven-story tower with another seven stories underground, and is renowned for its long history, architectural value, and ancient artifacts. The tower was first built in 695 AD during the Tang dynasty (618–907 AD).
 Tianyi Square: Located in the bustling old downtown of Ningbo City with the nationwide famous shopping complex, named after the Tianyi Ge (Chamber), the oldest private library in Asia.
 Nantang Old Street: An old commercial street by the river with many folk-custom shops, souvenir stores, and small restaurants. Previously, Nantang Street was a place for local fairs and flea markets. In 2013, the street was renovated to become a tourist site.
Liangzhu Cultural Park: A theme park dedicated to the story of the Butterfly Lovers, one of the four folklores in China. The Butterfly Lovers is reputed as the oriental version of Romeo and Juliet.
Baiyun Manor: An ancient academy where Huang Zongxi (黄宗羲) gave lectures. Huang, whose style name is Taichong, was a distinguished thinker, writer, and historian of the late Ming and early Qing periods.
 Tashan Weir: An ancient dam erected during the Tang dynasty.
Ningbo Wulongtan Scenic Scenic Resort: Also called Five-dragon Pools Scenic Resort, it is one of the Ten New Sceneries in Ningbo, and a National AAAA rated scenic area.

Yinzhou District
 Ningbo Museum (Yinzhou Museum, or Ningbo Historic Museum): A museum focused on Ningbo area history and traditional customs, considered the masterwork of Wang Shu, the first Chinese citizen to win the Pritzker Architecture Prize in 2012.
 Romon U-Park: One of the largest urban indoor theme parks in the world.
Ningbo Eastern New Town: A newly developed area of Ningbo City, with a well-designed CBD (including two 400m skyscrapers and other headquarters of many listed company and government offices), several museums, galleries, and shopping centers, including: 
Ningbo Urban Planning Exhibition Center
Ningbo Hankyu Commercial Complex: Opened in 2021, it is the first overseas outlet of Hankyu, the famous Japanese department store.
Ningbo New Library
Yinzhou Park and Ningbo Southern CBD
 Dongqian Lake: The largest natural freshwater lake in Zhejiang Province. The earliest historical record of the lake dates back to the West Jin dynasty, and there are several natural sceneries and historical attractions around the lake:
Little Putuo: An island on the lake with several temples built during the Song dynasty by a prime minister called Shihao.
Yuefei Temple: A temple built during the Song dynasty in memory of Yuefei.
Taogong Island: The place where Fanli and Xishi once lived according to folklore.
Southern Song Dynasty Rock Carving Park: won the "National Cultural Relics Conservation Best Project Award" awarded by the China National Architecture Research Association and the China Cultural Relics Conservation Foundation
Fuquan Mountain: a mountain with a Chinese tea theme park
Ningbo Hanling Old Street: an ancient street with a history thousands of years. It was once called Hanling City. The 'city' here means bazaar.
Qita Temple: A Zen Buddhist temple complex first consecrated during the Tang dynasty in the downtown area of Ningbo city.
 Tianhou Temple: A former temple of Mazu as the "Empress of Heaven" once used by Fujianese merchants as their guild hall (Qing'an Huiguan). In the 19th century, it was accounted by S. Wells Williams as the most beautiful place in Ningbo and by John Thomson as one of the most beautiful temples in China, but that structure was destroyed during the Chinese Civil War. It has been reconstructed with many of its original works of art, however, to form the East Zhejiang Maritime Affairs and Folk Customs Museum.
Temple of King Ashoka: a Buddhist temple first established during the Western Jin dynasty (282 AD).
Tiantong Temple: One of the "Five Chan Buddhism Temples". Tiantong Temple is the cradle of the Sōtō school (曹洞宗, Sōtō-shū) of Japanese Buddhism.
Ningbo Ocean World: An aquarium with an ocean theater
Ningbo Youngor Zoo
Ningbo Sakura Park (Zhongxing Sakura Park): A sakura park built to commemorate the friendship city between Ningbo City and Nagaoka City, Japan
Jiangbei District
 Sanjiangkou: The place where the Yong River, Yaojiang River, and Fenghua River meet, and the heart of old Ningbo city where the borders of 3 urban districts of Ningbo city meet. The aforementioned districts are Haishu District, Yingzhou District, and Jiangbei District. 
Old Bund (Old Waitan): A waterfront area and protected historical district in the center of Ningbo, built earlier than the Bund of Shanghai, with lots of early 19th century architectures, stores and restaurants.
 Baoguo Temple: The oldest intact wooden structure in eastern China. It is in the first batch of National Key Cultural Relics Protection Sites in China. Currently, it is the Baoguo Temple Ancient Architecture Museum, and has become a teaching and research base for many top architectural universities.
Ningbo Museum of Art
Ningbo Museum of Garden (宁波园林博物馆)
Sacred Heart Cathedral, Ningbo
Cicheng Ancient Town: A very well-maintained ancient Chinese ancient walled city built in the 8th century, including ancient-time schools, courts, temples, houses, commercial areas. In December 2009, the ancient buildings in Cicheng received the honorary award of the UNESCO Asia-Pacific Heritage Awards for Culture Heritage Conservation by UNESCO.
Yaojiang Park
Zhenhai District
 Jiulong Lake
 Zhaobao Mountain
The Seventeen Houses of Zheng's: The seventeen Houses of Zheng exemplify the classical style of residences during the Ming and Qing dynasties in the south part of Yangtze River Basin.
Ningbo Bang Museum and Culture Park: Displays exhibits related to the Ningbo Gang (Ningbo Merchants Group), and the development history of the business gang. It was one of the ten largest commercial groups during the Ming and Qing dynasties, and became the biggest commercial regional group of China in the late Qing dynasty.
Yugang Bao's Old House
Beilun District
Port Museum of China
Fenghua District
Xuedou Temple

Main tourist attractions in 2 counties 
Xiangshan County
 Yushan Islands
 Nantian Island
 Xiangshan Movie and Television Theme City
Ninghai County
 The Zhedong Grand Canyon
 Nanxi Hot Spring
 Qiantong Old Town

Main tourist attractions in 2 county-level cities 
Yuyao City (County)
 Hemudu Culture Relics Site and Museum: The relic site and museum of a Neolithic culture that flourished just south of Hangzhou Bay. The culture may be divided into early and late phases, before and after 4000 BC respectively. The site at Hemudu, 22 km northwest of Ningbo, was discovered in 1973. Hemudu sites were also discovered at Tianluoshan in Yuyao city, and on the islands of Zhoushan. Hemudu are said to have differed physically from inhabitants of the Yellow River sites to the north. Some authors propose that the Hemudu Culture was a source of the pre-Austronesian cultures.
Cixi City (County)
Dapeng Mountain

Notable people
Many well known Chinese came from Ningbo or have Ningbo as their ancestral home.

People in mainland China
Zhang Jianhong, freelance writer, playwright, poet, and democracy activist
Pan Tianshou, an artist in Chinese painting
Zhou Xinfang, an artist in Peking opera
Yu Lina, a violinist
Sha Menghai, a master calligrapher
Pang Lijuan, an educator and politician
Tu Youyou, a scientist awarded the Nobel Prize in Physiology or Medicine
Sang Lan, an advocate for improved conditions for the disabled in China
Shen Yueyue, a senior politician
Shi Xiaolin, a politician

People in Hong Kong
Run Run Shaw
Tung Chee Hwa
Tung Chao Yung
Chen Din Hwa
Stephen Chow
Sammo Hung
Yue-Kong Pao

People in Taiwan
Chiang Kai-shek, former President of the Republic of China, political and military leader of 20th century China
Chiang Ching-kuo, Chiang Kai-shek's son
Morris Chang

People overseas
Shien Biau Woo
Yo Yo Ma
Kin Yamei

Transportation

Bridge
With three main rivers running through Ningbo, bridges are crucial for the efficiency of the transport network in Ningbo. The Ling Bridge, which connects Haishu district and Jiangdong District, is the earliest modern bridge built in Ningbo, designed by German engineers. Since the late 1980s, 16 bridges have been built on the three rivers. Currently, another 27 bridges are under construction.

The Hangzhou Bay Bridge, a combination cable-stayed bridge and causeway across Hangzhou Bay, opened to the public on May 1, 2008. This bridge connects the municipalities of Shanghai and Ningbo, and is considered the longest trans-oceanic bridge in the world. It is the world's second-longest bridge, after the Lake Pontchartrain Causeway in Louisiana, United States.

The Xiangshan Harbor Bridge opened to traffic on December 29, 2012, connecting Ningbo with Xiangshan.

Sea
The port of Ningbo is the world's busiest port. It was ranked number 1 in total Cargo Volume (1.22 billion tonnes in 2021) and number 3 in total container traffic (31.1 million TEUs in 2021) since 2019.

Air
Ningbo Lishe International Airport connects Ningbo by air to the rest of China, with regularly scheduled domestic and international flights. In 2009, new air routes between Ningbo and Taiwan were opened. Jetstar Asia launched a new route between Ningbo and Singapore in September 2011. Tiger Air planned to begin flying this route from 26 December 2013.

Railway
Three railway lines intersect in Ningbo: the Xiaoshan–Ningbo Railway (Xiaoyong Line), which runs west to Hangzhou; the Ningbo–Taizhou–Wenzhou (Yongtaiwen) Railway, which runs south to Wenzhou; and the Hangzhou–Ningbo High-Speed Railway, which runs parallel to the Xiaoyong Line providing high-speed railway service.

With the booming economy in the region, the Xiaoyong Railway, a conventional railway built in the 1950s, could not meet the demand for railway travel between Zhejiang's two largest cities, so construction of a new high-speed railway line between Hangzhou and Ningbo started in 2009. The new railway line was finished in 2013 and reduced travel time between Ningbo and Hangzhou to 50 minutes.

The Ningbo–Taizhou–Wenzhou Railway is a high-speed railway that opened in September 2009. It connects Ningbo with cities along the coast to the south to Fujian Province.

Ningbo re-opened the Ningbo railway station after three years of construction on December 28, 2013. With a construction area of more than 120,000 m2, it is one of the largest railway stations in China.

Expressway
Seven expressways connect Ningbo with its surrounding cities:
 The Hangyong expressway, built in the 1990s, connects Hangzhou and Ningbo, and is now part of Hangzhou Bay ring expressway (G9211).
 The Yongtaiwen expressway (G15), opened in 2000, connects Ningbo with Taizhou and Wenzhou.
 The Yongjin expressway (G1512) connects Ningbo and Jinhua.
 The Huyong expressway (G15) connects Ningbo and Shanghai via the Hangzhou Bay bridge.
 The Yongzhou expressway (G9211) via Jintang Bridge.
 The G1504 Ningbo Ring Expressway
 The G1523 Ningbo–Dongguan Expressway

Rapid rail transit and subway
Ningbo has multiple metro lines in service, under construction, and under authorized planning:

Since the Metro lines above mainly serve the 6 urban districts of Ningbo, the Ningbo government announced several future plans to built further rapid transit to connect the 6 urban districts with the county-level cities and counties.

Military
Ningbo serves as the headquarters of the East Sea Fleet of the Chinese People's Liberation Army Navy.

Culture
As a city with giant ports, Ningbo influenced many countries near China, such as Japan.

Language

Ningbo speech is a dialect of Wu Chinese that has preserved many aspects of ancient Chinese phonology. Its original wording mode can be found in classical reference books. After the unequal treaty port opening, western culture gradually permeated Ningbo. Thus, the prefix " yang", meaning ocean or Western, before the nouns of imported goods is a special language phenomenon of Ningbo dialect.

Food
Ningbo is known for Ningbo Tangyuan, small stuffed buns which are boiled. The stuffing is usually ground sesame mixed with sugar or pork fat. The stuffing is then wrapped with sticky rice powder. Ningbo is even more well known throughout China for its seafood. Seafood markets are abundant, carrying extensive varieties of fish, shellfish, snails, jellyfish and other invertebrates, and sea vegetables in all stages of preparation from "still swimming," to cleaned and ready to cook, to fully cooked.

Festivals
While the Mid-Autumn Festival is usually celebrated on August 15th of the Lunar Calendar, Ningbo celebrates the festival a day later on the 16th. The most creditable history for this is that long ago, the whole city waited for Shih Hao, a Southern Sung prime minister, to celebrate the festival.

Education
At the end of 2020, there were 1,896 schools of all levels and types in the city, with a total of 1,418,000 students. Among them, there are 15 colleges and universities in Ningbo with 177,000 full-time students; 86 regular high schools with 93,000 students; 35 vocational schools with 69,000 students; 230 junior high schools with 217,000 students; and 427 primary schools with 517,000 students. There were also 838 full-time private primary and secondary schools (including kindergartens) in the city, with 258,000 students, accounting for 21.7% of the city's full-time primary and secondary school students. In the compulsory education section, there were 288,000 children of migrant workers who went to schools in Ningbo.

Ningbo is one of the top 200 cities in the world by scientific research as tracked by the Nature Index.

In the whole year of 2020, the city attracted 1,372 more workers with doctoral degrees, for a total of 9,265; 67,000 highly skilled talents, for a total of 551,000; 35 post-doctoral research stations, for a total of 224; and 166,000 graduates, a year-on-year increase of 20.5%. There are 10 offices, totaling 100. Throughout the year, 327,000 skilled personnel were trained in the city.

Higher-Educational institutions

Ningbo has 15 universities and colleges as of May 2021, as well as many research institutions that offer graduate degree programs. The following is a list of current universities and colleges in Ningbo.

As of 2020, many famous universities and research institutions have an operating campus or institutes in Ningbo, most of them offering graduate degree programs.

Compared to the other 14 sub-provincial cities in China, Ningbo has the fewest higher-educational institutions.

Secondary and primary education
Compulsory education is from the ages 6 to 15. Students are catered to in a variety of state and private schools. Studying for the Gaokao (高考), a cumulative test taken at the end of high school, is optional. At the end of 2020, there were 86 regular high schools with 93,000 students in Ningbo; 35 vocational schools with 69,000 students; 230 junior high schools with 21.7 students; and 427 primary schools with 517,000 students. There were also 838 full-time private primary and secondary schools (including kindergartens) in the city, with 258,000 students, accounting for 21.7% of the city's full-time primary and secondary school students. In the compulsory education section, there were 288,000 children of migrant workers who went to schools in Ningbo.

International education
Several schools are permitted to operate foreign educational programs as an alternative to the Chinese National curriculum and to accept international students.

Access International Academy Ningbo (AIAN) and Ningbo Zhicheng School International (NZSI) both offer the American AERO (American Education Reaches Out) curriculum with the College Board Advanced Placement examinations. Ningbo International School (NBIS) delivers the Cambridge International Primary and Secondary Curricula leading to iGCSE Examinations and A-Levels. Huamao Multicultural Education Academy is an IB World School and offers an international curriculum through the IB Primary Years Program for students ages 3–12 and the IB Diploma Program for students ages 16–19.

Twin towns – sister cities
Ningbo is twinned with:

See also
 List of twin towns and sister cities in China
 Jiangnan
 Sacred Heart Cathedral, Ningbo

References

External links 

 
 

 
Prefecture-level divisions of Zhejiang
Ningbo
National Forest Cities in China
Jiangnan